Drop the Mic is an American musical reality competition television series that premiered on October 24, 2017, airing on TBS for its first two seasons before moving to TNT for its third season on January 23, 2019. The show is based on a recurring segment on The Late Late Show with James Corden.

Overview
The show is a spin-off of a segment that was first introduced on The Late Late Show with James Corden. The series was announced on August 11, 2016, with a 2017 premiere. It was also confirmed that Corden would not be involved in an on-camera capacity, and a host would be announced at a later date. Corden serves as executive producer with his CBS late-night partner, Ben Winston and Jensen Karp.

Drop the Mic debuted on American cable network TBS on October 24, 2017. It is hosted by rapper and actor Method Man and model and television personality Hailey Bieber, with Joshua Silverstein providing original beats for each rap battle, while writers from The Late Late Show provide the lyrics.

On January 11, 2018, the show was renewed for a second season, which premiered on April 15.

On December 20, 2018, it was announced on its Twitter account that the series would be moving to TBS' sister network TNT on January 23, 2019. TBS would continue to air the series in reruns the following night.

On February 21, 2019, TNT announced that an upcoming episode featuring Empire star Jussie Smollett would be pulled from the current season and put on hold following Smollett's arrest. The episode also featured Danielle Brooks, Clay Aiken and Ian Ziering. However, the rap battle between Aiken and Ziering was released on social media.

Seasons

Episodes
Note: Winners are listed in bold

Season 1 (2017–18)
{{Episode table |background=#052EF9 |overall=5 |season=5 |title=56 |airdate=23 |viewers=11 |country=U.S. |viewersR= |episodes=

{{Episode list
 |EpisodeNumber = 2
 |EpisodeNumber2 = 2
 |Title = James Van Der Beek vs. Randall Park / Gina Rodriguez vs. Rob Gronkowski
 |OriginalAirDate = 
 |Viewers = 0.63
 |ShortSummary = Dawson's Creek heartthrob James Van Der Beek throws shade at Fresh Off the Boats Randall Park; NFL tight end and Super Bowl champion Rob Gronkowski finds out actor Gina Rodriguez might just be a problem he can't tackle.
 |LineColor = 052EF9
}}

}}

Season 2 (2018)
{{Episode table |background=#943563 |overall=5 |season=5 |title=56 |airdate=23 |viewers=11 |country=U.S. |viewersR= |episodes=

{{Episode list
 |EpisodeNumber = 18
 |EpisodeNumber2 = 7
 |Title = Hanson vs. Sam Richardson / Shaggy vs. Matthew Lillard'''
 |OriginalAirDate = 
 |Viewers = 0.40
 |ShortSummary = The lovable brothers of Hanson enter the savage battlegrounds to face Veep's hilarious Sam Richardson; Scooby-Doo alum and current voice of Shaggy Rogers, Matthew Lillard, is the underdog when paired against musician Shaggy.
 |LineColor = 943563
}}

}}

Season 3 (2019)

 Reception
Ratings
Season 1 (2017–18)

Season 2 (2018)

Accolades

See alsoThe Late Late Show with James Corden''

References

External links
 (TBS)
 (TNT)

2010s American reality television series
2017 American television series debuts
2019 American television series endings
English-language television shows
Hip hop television
Improvisational television series
Musical game shows
TBS (American TV channel) original programming
TNT (American TV network) original programming
American television spin-offs
The Late Late Show with James Corden